A paser is a device which generates a coherent beam of electrons.

Paser may also refer to:

People
Paser (vizier) of ancient Egypt
Paser I, viceroy of Kush
Paser II, viceroy of Kush
Paser (mayor under Ramses III)
other individuals named Paser, including the author of the Paser Crossword Stela

Other
4-Aminosalicylic acid, an antibiotic sold by Jacobus Pharmaceutical under the trademark Paser
Paser Regency, a regency in East Kalimantan Province, Indonesia
Pavement Surface Evaluation and Rating, a scale of pavement condition